Showdown is an April 1978 album by the Isley Brothers. It was released on their T-Neck Records label. Singles released from the album include  the #1 funk/disco hit, "Take Me to the Next Phase" and the top 20 R&B slower, "Groove With You". The album became another platinum album for the Isley Brothers. It was remastered and expanded for inclusion in the 2015 released CD box set The RCA Victor & T-Neck Album Masters, 1959-1983.

Release
Showdown was released 22 April 1978 on the Isley Brother's own T-Neck Records label. It was their sixteenth album release.

It was remastered and expanded for inclusion in the 2015 released CD box set The RCA Victor & T-Neck Album Masters, 1959-1983.

Reception

Spawning the #1 funk/disco hit, Take Me to the Next Phase (Part 1 & 2) and the top 20 R&B slower, "Groove With You", the album became another platinum album for the Isley Brothers. Though not released as a single, the smooth funk jam "Coolin' Me Out" was also a hit.

Track listing
Unless otherwise noted, Information is based on Liner notes

Note
While ”Take Me to the Next Phase” sounds like a live stadium recording, it is actually a studio recording with audience overdubs.  Additional crowd noises are provided by Ernie Isley, Marvin Isley and Chris Jasper.

Personnel
Ronald Isley - lead vocals, background vocals
O'Kelly Isley, Jr. - background vocals
Rudolph Isley - background vocals
Chris Jasper - percussion (5), foot stomps (5), piano, keyboards, ARP synthesizers, clavinet, tambourine, background vocals 
Marvin Isley - foot stomps (5), bass, woodblock, cowbell, percussion, background vocals 
Ernie Isley - congas, percussion (1, 3, 5, 7), foot stomps (5), guitar, drums, timbales, maracas, background vocals
Technical
John Holbrook - recording engineer
Thomas Mark - recording engineer

Charts

Weekly charts

Year-end charts

Singles

See also
List of number-one R&B albums of 1978 (U.S.)

External links
 The Isley Brothers-Showdown at Discogs
The Isley Brothers-Showdown at Allmusic

References

1978 albums
The Isley Brothers albums
T-Neck Records albums